2,4,6-Trichlorobenzoyl chloride or Yamaguchi's reagent is an chlorinated aromatic compound that is commonly used in a variety of organic syntheses.

Yamaguchi esterification 
It is the primary reactant in Yamaguchi esterification. 2,4,6-Trichlorobenzoyl chloride readily reacts with alcohols. This newly formed reagent, when mixed with a stoichiometric amount of 4-dimethylaminopyridine, cyclizes and forms esters. This reaction creates 2,4,6-trichlorobenzoic acid as a byproduct.

Preparation 
2,4,6-Trichlorobenzoyl chloride is prepared by reacting 2,4,6-trichloroaniline with N-butyllithium in a carbon dioxide atmosphere. This produces 2,4,6-trichlorobenzoic acid, which can then be refluxed in thionyl chloride to form 2,4,6-trichlorobenzoyl chloride.

Since 2,4,6-trichlorobenzoic acid is produced as a by product of the esterification process, it can be refluxed again to recreate 2,4,6-trichlorobenzoyl chloride.

References 

Chlorobenzenes
Acyl chlorides
Reagents for organic chemistry